This is a list of ethnic enclaves in various countries of different ethnic and cultural backgrounds to the native population. An ethnic enclave in this context denotes an area primarily populated by a population with similar ethnic or racial background. This list also includes concentrations rather than enclaves, and historic examples which may no longer be an ethnic enclave.

List by world region and national origin

Africa

African Americans

List of African-American neighborhoods - Thousands of African-American neighborhoods exist today. However, many of these communities are now less populated by African Americans than they were during the earlier, sometimes mid and late parts of the 20th century.

Angola
 Chicago, Illinois
 Brockton, Massachusetts

Benin
 Chicago, Illinois

Cameroon
 Prince George's County, Maryland
 Houston, Texas

Cape Verde
 Brockton, Massachusetts
 Fall River, Massachusetts
 New Bedford, Massachusetts
 Fox Point, Providence, Rhode Island (historically Cape Verdean, now gentrifying).
 Pawtucket, Rhode Island (Cape Verdean – largest Cape Verde community outside their islands).

Congo (Brazzaville and DRC)
 Lynn, Massachusetts
 Charlotte, North Carolina
 Raleigh-Durham, North Carolina
 Greensboro, North Carolina
 Dallas-Fort Worth Metroplex
 Des Moines, Iowa
 Champaign, Illinois

Cote d'Ivoire
 Baltimore, Maryland
 New York City

Ethiopia
 Washington, D.C. - See also Ethiopians in Washington, D.C.
 Little Ethiopia (Washington, D.C.)
 Silver Spring, Maryland
 Little Ethiopia, Denver, Colorado.
 Little Ethiopia, Los Angeles, California (Ethiopian, Eritrean) - largest Ethiopian community outside Africa. Nearby Fairfax District, Los Angeles has many Ethiopians, including Ethiopian Jews, close to West Los Angeles' large Jewish population. It has other immigrants from Africa (i.e. Kenya, Somalia, Sudan, Tanzania and Uganda). 
 Little Ethiopia, Seattle, Washington.
Minneapolis-Saint Paul, Minnesota is home to many Somali, Oromo, Ethiopian and Eritrean immigrants.
 Oakland, CA has over 20,000 Ethiopian and Eritrean people.

Nigeria
 Houston, Texas has the largest Nigerian American community. 
 Alief, Texas Nigerian American capital of the nation
 New York City, New York has a large Nigerian immigrant and Nigerian American population

Somalia
 Little Mogadishu, Minneapolis - largest Somali community in North America.

Other or pan-African
 Fairfax District, Los Angeles – Moroccans, esp. Moroccan Jews
 Black Canadians in Montreal: see (Little Burgundy, Côte-des-Neiges–Notre-Dame-de-Grâce, LaSalle, Pierrefonds-Roxboro, Villeray-Saint-Michel-Parc-Extension)

Asia (East, South and Southeast)
 Orange County, California – largest Asian nationality is Vietnamese. Third largest Asian-American population in the US after Greater Los Angeles and Santa Clara Valley in California.
 Carmel, Indiana - Large Asian community of about 10,000 as of 2019. Includes Chinese, Korean, Indian and some Japanese among others.
https://datausa.io/profile/geo/carmel-in/
 Vancouver, British Columbia, Canada.
Armenia
 Little Armenia in Los Angeles, California.

Bangladesh
 Little Bangladesh in Los Angeles, California. There has been South Asian immigration in central Los Angeles.

Burma/Myanmar
 Fort Wayne, Indiana.
 Indianapolis, Indiana (About 24,000, ~2.8% of total population), especially Perry Township, Marion County
 Greenwood, Indiana
 Tulsa, Oklahoma – (Mostly Zomi)
 Albany, New York – (Primarily Karen)
 Buffalo.
 Rogers Park, Chicago (Rohingya)
 Milwaukee (likely home to the largest Rohingya population in the US)

Cambodia

 Cambodia Town, Long Beach, California, United States.
 Lowell, Massachusetts.
 Merced, California.
 Porterville, California.
 Stockton, California.

China

 Auburn, California – Gold rush era in 1850s
 Boise, Idaho (historic).
Barrio Chino (Havana)
Barrio Chino (Mexico City)
Barrio Chino (San José, Costa Rica)
 Brossard, Quebec (has the largest Chinese population in Quebec).
 China Alley, Hanford, California (historic).
 Chinatown, Calgary
 Chinatown, Edmonton
 "Chinamerica" – Puente Hills, California area near Los Angeles.
 Chinatown, San Francisco, California 
 Irvine, California (along with from Taiwan).
 La Chinesca – Mexicali, Baja California.
 La Mesa (Tijuana)
 Markham, Ontario
 Chinatown, Oakland in Oakland, CA
 Richmond, British Columbia
 San Gabriel Valley, California - Largest Chinese enclave outside of China.
 Toronto, Ontario (Chinatown, Toronto, East Chinatown, Toronto, Scarborough)
 West Covina, California – notably large Chinese/Asian population.

Hmong
 Detroit Metropolitan Area, Michigan (Significantly decreased since 1990s)
 The Fox Cities, Wisconsin.
Fresno, CA (4.9% of city population)
 Frogtown, Saint Paul, Minnesota. also known as "Little Mekong", there are other Hmong in Minneapolis metro area.
 Marion, Hickory, Morganton, North Carolina – About 5,000 Hmong live in the statistical area.
Gresham, Oregon (Iu Mien)
Salem, Oregon (Iu Mien)

India

 Edison, New Jersey – known as the first Little India in the USA.
 Hicksville, New York (Little India).
 Little India, Artesia, California: Pioneer Boulevard, between 183rd St. and South St., Artesia

Iran
 "Tehrangeles" (Los Angeles – a portmanteau deriving from the combination of Tehran, the capital of Iran, and Los Angeles.

Japan

 Alameda, California (historic).
 Leimert Park, Los Angeles (mainly Japanese from 1920s-50s).
Little Tokyo, Cuauhtémoc, Mexico City
 Markham, Ontario near Toronto, Ontario in Canada.

Korea

 Annandale, Virginia.
Barrio Coreano (Guatemala City), also known as Avenida Seúl.
 Irvine, California (among other Asians).
 Little Seoul, Newport News, Virginia.
Pequeño Seúl – Mexico City
 Riverside, California
 Santa Clara County, California Contains several "Koreatown" districts in Santa Clara (Unmarked) and San Jose (See Koreatown, San Jose)

Laos
 Chollas View, San Diego, California – Laotian immigrant enclave.

Pakistan

 Westwood, Los Angeles, California – also has Persians from Iran (Persia Square).

Philippines

 Carson, California. It has a "Little Manila".
 Cerritos, California.
 Daly City, California.
 Delano, California – where "Larry Itliong Day" was dedicated
 Kansas City, Missouri.
 "Philly-pino-town" Philadelphia, Pennsylvania.
 Torrance, California.
 West Covina, California, centered on "Manila Way" on Amar Rd. and Azusa Ave.
 Winnipeg, Manitoba.

Sri Lanka
 Covina, California with a Sri Lankan community center in West Covina, California.
 Little Sri Lanka, Tompkinsville, Staten Island, New York City.
 Toronto (Malvern) (Toronto is home to the largest Tamil-speaking population outside South Asia).

Thailand
 North side Chicago, Illinois.

Vietnam

 Argyle, Chicago, Illinois.
 Little Saigon in Southeast Albuquerque, New Mexico
 Arlington, Texas
 Bay St. Louis, Mississippi.
 Biloxi, Mississippi.
 D'Iberville, Mississippi.
 Orange County, California.
San Jose, California
 Little Saigons in Massachusetts
 New Orleans, Louisiana (Village de L'Est)
 Portland, Oregon – there is a large Vietnamese community in North Portland and Beaverton.

European or Anglo origin

Australia

 Manhattan, New York
 Santa Monica, California
 Whistler, British Columbia

Albania
 Albanian Town, Chicago.
 Astoria, Queens, New York City, New York.
 Detroit, Michigan. See also History of the Albanian Americans in Metro Detroit
 Pelham Parkway (neighborhood), Bronx, New York City, New York.
 South Boston, Boston, Massachusetts.
 Worcester, Massachusetts.

Basque
  Malheur County, Oregon - Basques shepherds migrated to Southeastern Oregon settling in the communities of Arock, Basque, Burns and Jordan Valley.
 Elko, Nevada 
 Reno, Nevada
 Boise, Idaho 
 Bakersfield, California

Belgium
 Sarnia, Ontario, Canada – "Flemish or Dutch Corridor" to Chatham, Ontario.

Croatia
 Pueblo, Colorado.

Denmark
 Elk Horn, Iowa.
 Kimballton, Iowa.
 Solvang, California.
 Tyler, Minnesota.

Eastern European Jewish

 Orange Park, Florida in the Jacksonville, Florida area – in addition, has non-Jewish Slavic groups, Romanians, Hungarians and Albanians.

Finland
 Stanton Township, Michigan.
 Thunder Bay.

France

 Linden, Alabama
 Reynoldston, New York in Franklin County, New York facing Quebec, Canada.
 Most of Quebec as well as much of Acadia in Canada 
 French Town, Los Angeles (historic, Basque)

Germany

 Deutschtown, Pittsburgh, Pennsylvania.
 Hanover, Pennsylvania.
 Pennsylvania Dutch Country (also Swiss in origin)
 St. Marys, Pennsylvania – Bavarian Catholic.
Over-the-Rhine, Cincinnati, Ohio
Germantown & Schnitzelburg In Louisville (Historic)

Greece

 Astoria, Queens, New York.
 Campbell, Ohio.
 Cleveland, Ohio.
 Greektown, Tarpon Springs, Florida.
 Greek Town, Omaha, Nebraska (historic).
 La Merced historical Greektown in Mexico City along Calle Academia (Academia Street).
 Naucalpan, State of Mexico a large Greek community has formed outside of Mexico City.
 New Smyrna Beach, Florida.
 "Old Greek Town", Salt Lake City, Utah - the state has a Greek community.
 Palm Desert, California – where they have an annual Greek festival near the local Greek Orthodox church.
 Sinaloa, Mexico - this Mexican state has coastal Greek communities. The cities of Culiacan, Humaya, Tamazula and Yoreme have the largest Greek concentrations in Sinaloa where the cultivation of tomato brought them fortunes and the valley is known as "Valle de Grecia" or the "Greek Valley".
 Upper Darby, Pennsylvania.
 West Los Angeles – historically, the Toy District in Downtown LA had Greeks.

Iceland
 Gimli, Manitoba, Canada – thought to be the largest Icelandic community outside Iceland.
 Spanish Fork, Utah – large concentration, most of them are Mormon in religion. See Icelandic Heritage in Spanish Fork, Utah
 Washington Island, Wisconsin – an estimated 20% of Icelandic descent.

Ireland

 Boston, Massachusetts (portions and many suburbs) – largest Irish city outside Ireland. Peak percentage nearing 50% in 1920 after 70 years of immigration.
 Irish Hill, Louisville (historic)

Italy

 Little Italy, Los Angeles, California (historic; now Chinatown).
 Little Italy, Manhattan, New York City – now engulfed by expanded Chinatown. and much of Long Island and Rochester
 Little Italy, San Diego, California.
 "Little Tuscany", Palm Springs, California.
 McAlester, Oklahoma in historic Choctaw Nation.
 Palm Desert, California
 Providence, Rhode Island
 Teterboro, New Jersey.
 Tontitown, Arkansas – resettlement of earlier Italian community in Lake Village, Arkansas.
 Via Italia, San Pedro, California.
 Yorktown, New York
 Italian Canadians in Greater Montreal: La Petite-Italie, Saint-Leonard (Città Italiana), Rivière-des-Prairies, Montreal-Nord, LaSalle, and the Saint-Raymond area of Notre-Dame-de-Grâce.

Luxembourg
Naperville, Illinois – also Liechtenstein residents.
Port Washington, Wisconsin.
St. Donatus, Iowa.

Malta
 The Junction, Toronto, Ontario. Little Malta is in the western part of this Toronto neighbourhood.
 Astoria, Queens has a Little Malta.

Portugal
 Fall River, Massachusetts – Has the highest concentration of Portuguese Americans in the United States at 43.9%.
 Allentown, Pennsylvania – including Brazilians and other Latin Americans.
 Artesia, California – sizable, in the "International District", known for ethnic diversity.
 Little Portugal, Newark, New Jersey (Ironbound section).

Russia
 Orange Park, Florida in the Jacksonville, Florida area – from throughout the former USSR and Soviet Bloc (Eastern Europe).
 Brighton Beach, New York in the Brooklyn area – large Ukrainian and Russian communities.
 Woodburn, Oregon – large Russian Old believer community as well as Russian Molokans, Doukhobors and recent refugees from the former Soviet Union: Ukrainian and Russian Pentecostals and Baptists.

Scandinavia

 Saskatoon, Saskatchewan (est. 10% Norwegian ancestry and other Scandinavians).

Serbia

 Boyle Heights, Los Angeles (historic, Serbian-Americans moved out in 1940s-50s).

Slovenia
 Eveleth, Minnesota.
 St. Vitus Village, Cleveland (Slovenian Village).
 Pueblo, Colorado

United Kingdom

Cornwall 
 Butte, Montana.
 Deadwood, South Dakota.
 Grass Valley, California.
 Iron Ranges of northern Michigan.
 Mineral Point, Wisconsin.
 Pachuca, Mexico (large Cornish-British colony).
 Tangier Island, Virginia.

Wales 
 Gallia County, Ohio – a.k.a. Little Wales.
 Sharon, Pennsylvania.

Middle East, Caucasus, and Central Asia
Largest Arab-American and Middle eastern enclaves. Main Article: List of Arabic neighborhoods:
 Chicago – A section of city nicknamed "Little Iraq", Chicago has the largest Iraqi community in the USA. Little Arabia in the city's Northwest side, for example, has many Arab-Americans. And Devon Avenue (Chicago) has Arabs, Iranians and South Asians like Pashtun Americans. 
 Cleveland, Ohio – west side.
 Detroit (i.e. Southwest side) – over 300,000 Arab-Americans in its Metro area, another 300,000 throughout Michigan, the city and state is the largest Arab-American community in the USA. Dearborn is their cultural center in the region. Also in nearby Dearborn Heights.
 Montreal – includes North African (esp. Moroccans) immigrants, Lebanese and Syrians.
 Orange County, California – 250,000 out of 500,000 Arab-Americans in Greater Los Angeles. Brookhurst Street in Anaheim is called "Little Arabia" or "Little Gaza" named for the Gaza Strip, as well West Bank of Anaheim named for the West Bank in Palestine.
 Ottawa – Canada's capital city has one of the largest arab/middle eastern populations in Canada. One in ten arabs in Canada live in Ottawa.
 San Diego, California metro area – eastern San Diego metro area - Little Baghdad in El Cajon and along El Cajon Boulevard in East San Diego and La Mesa, California).

Afghanistan 
 Chicago, Illinois has a "Little Kabul".
 Sacramento County, California - By far the largest Afghan immigrant population in the USA, with 15,400 at last count.
 Ventura County, California – Afghans and Iranians relocated to the area (the most in Simi Valley and Thousand Oaks).
 New Mexico – there is a small but growing community of Afghan refugees in Albuquerque, Rio Rancho and Las Cruces. The majority are Pashtun but there are some Hazara and other ethnic groups. The community is religiously diverse with Sunni and Shia Muslims, Ismailis and irreligious.

Armenia 

 Fresno, California (Old Armenian Town off Ventura Blvd)
Glendale, California (Armenian American cultural center) and nearby Atwater Village, Los Angeles. See also Distribution of Armenians in Los Angeles county

Kurds 
 Binghamton, New York
 Dallas, Texas and its area.
 Houston, Texas.
 Los Angeles, California.
 Nashville, Tennessee (cultural center) – around 20,000 in the city.
 Santa Barbara, California-Ventura County, California region in Southern California – may have the most Kurds in the USA.
 Watertown, Massachusetts, suburb of Boston.

South/Latin America and Caribbean

 Anaheim, California – 46% Mexican, large Salvadoran population, and Puerto Rican community.
 Excelsior District, San Francisco, California.
 Miami-Dade County, Florida (Miami metro area has the largest Cuban population in the US with an estimate of 1 million Cuban-American residents with a large presence of Haitians, Jamaicans, Colombians, Brazilians, Nicaraguans, Puerto Ricans and Dominicans throughout the county)
 New York City Most Hispanics/Latinos of any US city, large Hispanic/Latino communities. 
 Providence, Rhode Island - The state itself has a large and growing Latino community.
East Oakland, California

Central and South America
 Anaheim, California and nearby West Anaheim, California in Orange County.
 Boston, Massachusetts – also Dominican and Puerto Rican sections - esp the South end.

Guatemala
The Kimmeytown neighborhood in Georgetown, Delaware

Indigenous Mayan immigrants from Guatemala in north Georgia, especially in Cherokee County.

El Salvador
Except Puerto Ricans (fourth as a nationality, second in ancestry among Hispanics and Latinos), Salvadorans are the second largest Hispanic/Latino ethnicity in the US, close to Dominicans who are third. Large Salvadoran communities developed in the late 20th–early 21st century period as a result of civil war, economic conditions, political turmoil and gang violence in the country, the country El Salvador is among the smallest in size in the Western Hemisphere. The largest Salvadoran population is in Central parts of Los Angeles and throughout California (i.e. the Coachella Valley/Riverside county) along with Central American groups like Guatemalans, Hondurans and Nicaraguans. Recent census data shows that for the first time, there are more Salvadorans living on Long Island than Puerto Ricans, with Salvadorans now numbering nearly 100,000, representing nearly a quarter of all Hispanics in the region, making them the largest Latino group in Long Island (New York State). 
 Washington, D.C. (esp. Mount Pleasant), and nearby Maryland and Northern Virginia suburbs. Formerly known as Arlandria, a neighborhood between Alexandria and Arlington in Virginia is now referred to as Chirilagua, due to the many Salvadorans living there from that particular town.

Mexico

Note: Since immigrants from Mexico have been the largest group for a long time and have spread throughout the country perhaps more than any other nationality in recent times, Mexican-American enclaves are far more numerous than this list would suggest.
 Altus, Oklahoma
 Boyle Heights, Los Angeles, California (gentrifying).
 Downey, California – most affluent Mexican-American community.
 East Los Angeles, California – historic urban Mexican-American enclave (see Chicano).
 Guymon, Oklahoma – in the Oklahoma Panhandle.
 Huntington Park, California
 Indio, California – over half Mexican, esp. from Michoacán.
 Logan Heights, San Diego, California (also known for Chicano Park).
 Redlands, California – Barrio Judeo or Negro (also had many Jews and African-Americans).
 Riverside, California – esp. the East Side.
 Wilmington, Los Angeles, California.

West Indies and Caribbean

 Blue Hills, Connecticut (23.9% Jamaican, highest Jamaican population in the US).
Little Haiti, Miami
Little Havana, Miami
Divina Providencia, Tijuana, Baja California – known as Pequeña Haití
 The Triangle, North Carolina (Cuban, as well Puerto Rican and increasingly Mexican neighborhoods).
 Louisville, Kentucky (Cuban – especially in the 40214 zip code and in Okolona)
 Westchester, Florida (65.69% Cuban, highest Cuban population in the US)
 Westside Simi Valley, California – some Puerto Rican, but more Mexican section of largely Anglo city.

Pacific Islands and Oceania

Samoa
 Honolulu, Hawaii
 American Samoa
 Long Beach, California

Tonga
 Honolulu, Hawaii
 American Samoa
 Sacramento, California
 Los Angeles, California
 Salt Lake City, Utah

Marshall Islands
 Springdale, Arkansas
 Tigard, Oregon

Micronesia
 Honolulu, Hawaii

Guam and the Northern Mariana Islands (Chamorro and Carolinians)
 Honolulu, Hawaii
 Las Vegas, Nevada

Others

Jews (of many nationalities)

 Jewtown, Port Richmond, Staten Island, NYC
 Kiryas Joel, New York near Monroe, New York – homogeneously Hasidic Jewish private housing tract. Similar communities Kiryas Square, New York and New Square, New York.
 Lakewood, New Jersey – Large Orthodox Jewish community, and one of US' largest populations of Hasidim.
 Lombard Street (Baltimore) (Jewtown, Baltimore) – also was an Italian neighborhood.
 Los Angeles (San Fernando Valley, etc)
 Lower East Side, Manhattan, New York City (historic) – NYC is world's largest Jewish community outside Israel (10–20% of Jewish faith or descent, or 1.1 million – 1.5 million observant Jews).
 Petaluma, California

Native Americans
 Urban Indians, communities developed by small enclaves of Native Americans/First Nations and Alaskan Natives since the 1930s. They tend to form small percentages of the urban areas' population. Virtually every major city in the US has an American Indian community. See Rancherie/ Ranchería for urban Indian parts of Las Vegas, Nevada and Reno, Nevada. Urban Indian reserves in Canada have also been located within Canadian cities.

The highest concentration of urban Indians in the United States is believed to be in Anchorage, Alaska where over 10 percent of the population identify themselves in the census as having some Native ancestry, with 7.3 percent identifying that as their only ancestry. In the mainland USA, Indian Alley in downtown Los Angeles, California, may be the most dense Native American population of any major city.

The second highest concentration of urban Indians in the U.S. is Albuquerque, New Mexico where at least 5 percent of the population belong to recognized Native American tribes such as the Navajo, Apache and Pueblo (Keresan, Tiwa, Tewa, Towa, Zuni). Southeast Albuquerque has the largest Native American community in the city but Native communities can also be found on the Westside and Rio Rancho. Albuquerque also has a Cherokee diaspora community known as the Cherokee Southwest Township. A much larger percentage of the population possess some Native ancestry but identity as Hispanos, Mestizos or Genizaros. This population lives all over the Albuquerque metro area but is concentrated in the South Valley and Bernalillo.

Winnipeg, Manitoba has the largest indigenous population of any major city in Canada both in terms of percentage (12.2 percent) and total number. Other Canadian cities with significant First Nations populations include Prince George, British Columbia and Saskatoon, Sasketchewan.

San Francisco Bay Area – The US' largest, mainly in Oakland

Smaller off-reservation cities and towns with significant Native American populations include:
 Anadarko, Oklahoma – see Indian City USA.
 Lawton, Oklahoma
 Gallup, New Mexico
 Farmington, New Mexico
 Grants, New Mexico
 Flagstaff, Arizona
 Tucson, Arizona
 Holbrook, Arizona
 Winslow, Arizona
 Page, Arizona
 Billings, Montana
 Rapid City, South Dakota
 Madras, Oregon
 Pendleton, Oregon
 Spokane, Washington
 Fairbanks, Alaska
 Nome, Alaska
 Blanding, Utah
 Rolla, North Dakota

See also 
 Multiculturalism.
 Block settlement, in Canada, a rural equivalent to an urban ethnic neighborhood.
 Demographics of California.
 Demographics of Los Angeles.
 Indian colony, an urban reservation in the United States.
 New York City ethnic enclaves.
 Urban Indian reserve in Canada.

References

External links
 Asian-Nation: Asian American Ethnic Communities & Enclaves
 Little Italys around the World
 Ethnic Enclaves in the Urbanism of America
 The New Ethnic Enclaves in America's Suburbs (pdf)
 Diversity and Community: Ethnic Enclaves and Segregation

Demographic lists
 
 
Neighbourhoods in Canada
Neighborhoods in the United States